Dean Bernardini (born December 27, 1973) is an American musician, best known as the former bass guitarist and backing vocalist for the rock band Chevelle. He joined the band in 2005 after the departure of Joe Loeffler, who had been a member of the group since 1995. Bernardini is also a noted visual artist and woodworker; the cover of the 2009 album Sci-Fi Crimes was an original 24x48 oil on canvas painting by Bernardini, and he also supplied an original oil on canvas painting for the band's 2012 album Stray Arrows: A Collection of Favorites.

History 
Before Chevelle, Bernardini played drums in the Chicago band Liftpoint. Bernardini taught himself to play bass by listening to and attempting to copy bass lines on albums. The first album he played to was Muse's Absolution. When Joe Loeffler left Chevelle, Bernardini, who is married to Pete, Joe, and Sam Loeffler's sister, replaced him.

In May 2006, Bernardini injured his left hand forcing the band to pull out of the first eight concert dates (from June 30 to July 26) with Nickelback and Hoobastank. In September 2019, Bernardini announced he would take a hiatus from Chevelle to focus on his family and personal projects.

Equipment 
In a feature in Bass Player, Bernardini stated that he uses Gibson Thunderbird and Ibanez BTB bass guitars with Mesa Boogie Big Block 750 amplifiers and Mesa 8x10 cabinets for both clean and distorted tones. He is also a featured artist by both Gibson Guitars and Ibanez Guitars.

The Thunderbirds Bernardini plays are custom built by Ryan Loux of Loux Custom Instruments. One is black with a  scale and Chevelle logo inlays, and another is a white bass that features a custom inlaid fretboard inspired by a Picasso painting, and featuring Nordstrand pickups and an extended  scale length. The Ibanez BTB570s are modified by Bernardini by refinishing and installing hand-made pickguards and Bartonlini pickups.

He uses custom gauge (65-85-115-130) GHS strings.

Discography 

with Chevelle
 Vena Sera (2007)
 Sci-Fi Crimes (2009)
 Hats Off to the Bull (2011)
 La Gárgola (2014)
 The North Corridor (2016)

References 

1973 births
American heavy metal bass guitarists
Living people
Guitarists from Illinois
People from Deerfield, Illinois
American male bass guitarists
21st-century American bass guitarists
21st-century American male musicians